The Castle of Alcalá de los Gazules (Spanish: Castillo) is a castle located in Alcalá de los Gazules, Spain. It was declared Bien de Interés Cultural in 1993.

References 

Bien de Interés Cultural landmarks in the Province of Cádiz
Castles in Andalusia
Ruined castles in Spain